Yankee Hill (formerly, Rich Gulch and Spanishtown) is an unincorporated community and census-designated place in Butte County, California. The population was 333 at the 2010 census.

History
Rich Gulch was settled in 1850. When Chilean and Spanish miners arrived in the 1850s, the place was renamed to Spanishtown. New Englanders settled later, applying the current name. A post office operated at Yankee Hill from 1858 to 1951. A modern-day post office is still in operation at the Pines Hardware Store, 11300A Miller Flat Rd. in Yankee Hill.

Demographics
At the 2010 census Yankee Hill had a population of 333. The racial makeup of Yankee Hill was 305 (91.6%) White, 2 (0.6%) African American, 7 (2.1%) Native American, 4 (1.2%) Asian, 0 (0.0%) Pacific Islander, 5 (1.5%) from other races, and 10 (3.0%) from two or more races. Hispanic or Latino of any race were 22 people (6.6%).

The whole population lived in households, no one lived in non-institutionalized group quarters and no one was institutionalized.

There were 155 households, 21 (13.5%) had children under the age of 18 living in them, 71 (45.8%) were opposite-sex married couples living together, 14 (9.0%) had a female householder with no husband present, 11 (7.1%) had a male householder with no wife present.  There were 16 (10.3%) unmarried opposite-sex partnerships, and 1 (0.6%) same-sex married couples or partnerships. 45 households (29.0%) were one person and 20 (12.9%) had someone living alone who was 65 or older. The average household size was 2.15.  There were 96 families (61.9% of households); the average family size was 2.53.

The age distribution was 33 people (9.9%) under the age of 18, 18 people (5.4%) aged 18 to 24, 59 people (17.7%) aged 25 to 44, 140 people (42.0%) aged 45 to 64, and 83 people (24.9%) who were 65 or older.  The median age was 53.6 years. For every 100 females, there were 99.4 males.  For every 100 females age 18 and over, there were 96.1 males.

There were 182 housing units at an average density of ,of which 155 were occupied, 125 (80.6%) by the owners and 30 (19.4%) by renters.  The homeowner vacancy rate was 1.6%; the rental vacancy rate was 8.8%.  268 people (80.5% of the population) lived in owner-occupied housing units and 65 people (19.5%) lived in rental housing units.

References

Census-designated places in Butte County, California
Populated places established in 1850
1850 establishments in California
Census-designated places in California